Bart Stevens (born 29 January 1998) is a Dutch tennis player. By reaching the quarterfinals at the 2023 Qatar ExxonMobil Open – Doubles (ATP Tour) on 22 February 2023, Stevens reached a career high ATP doubles ranking of No. 102 in the world. He also has a career high singles ranking of World No. 736 achieved on 14 October 2019.

Professional career
ITF Men's World Tennis Tour

Bart Stevens won ten ITF Men's World Tennis Tour doubles titles (partnering Marc Dijkhuizen (M15), Mats Hermans (M15) and Jesper de Jong (M15 and M25).
See the table below.

ATP Challenger

Stevens won five ATP Challenger doubles titles at
 2021 Open de Rennes(draw)
 2021 Challenger Ciudad de Guayaquil(draw)
 2022 Santa Cruz Challenger II(draw)
 2022 Garden Open(draw)
 2023 Bahrain MIO Tennis Challenger(draw)
See the table below.

ATP Tour

 Stevens made his ATP debut (ATP Tour 500-, hard) as a pair partnering Tim van Rijthoven at the 2022 ABN AMRO World Tennis Tournament in Rotterdam.
 With a wildcard and together with Jesper de Jong, Stevens participated in the main draw at 2022 Libéma Open  (ATP Tour 250-R16-grass).
 The quarterfinals of 2022 Tel Aviv Open (ATP Tour 250-hard-indoor, immediately admitted to the main draw) were reached together with Sander Arends.
 Together with Tallon Griekspoor, Stevens was immediately admitted to the main draw at 2022 Generali Open Kitzbühel (ATP Tour 250-clay, reached the quarterfinals) and the main draw at 2023 Qatar ExxonMobil Open (ATP Tour 250-hard-outdoor, reached the quarterfinals).

Dutch Championships

Together with Jesper de Jong, Stevens reached the men's doubles final in December 2021  and became runner-up.

ATP en ITF - Tour & Dutch Championships - 26 Finals

ATP Challenger Tour-Doubles: 9 (W-L: 5-4)

ITF World Tennis Tour-Doubles: 16 (W-L: 10-6)

Dutch Championships-Doubles: 1 (W-L: 0-1)

ATP rankings

ATP rankings - year-end (doubles):

ATP ranking -current-Pepperstone ranking (doubles)

External links

References

 Bart Stevens in Brabants Dagblad d.d. 10 June 2022-Hoe een val de prioriteit van tennisser Bart Stevens liet verschuiven naar het dubbelspel 
 Bart Stevens in Brabants Dagblad d.d. 19 June 2019-Tussen de drinkende Russen en spelende kinderen werkte Bart Stevens aan zijn tenniscarrière 
 Bart Stevens in Eindhovens Dagblad d.d. 2 January 2016-Bart Stevens treft Bart Beks in finale Valkencourt 

1998 births
Living people
Dutch male tennis players
People from Waalwijk
Sportspeople from North Brabant
21st-century Dutch people